The 1936 Delaware Fightin' Blue Hens football team was an American football team that represented the University of Delaware in the 1936 college football season. In their second season under head coach Lyal Clark, the Blue Hens compiled a 2–6 record and were outscored by a total of 125 to 51. The team played its home games at Frazer Field in Newark, Delaware.

Schedule

References

Delaware
Delaware Fightin' Blue Hens football seasons
Delaware Fightin' Blue Hens football